A Christmas village (or putz) is a decorative, miniature-scale village often set up during the Christmas season. These villages are rooted in the elaborate Christmas traditions of the Moravian church, a Protestant denomination. Mass-produced cardboard Christmas villages became popular in the United States during the early and mid-20th century, while porcelain versions became popular in the later part of the century.

History

Origins

The tradition of decorative Christmas villages built around the Christmas tree is rooted in the late 18th century holiday traditions of the Moravian church, a Protestant denomination with early settlements in Salem, North Carolina and Bethlehem, Pennsylvania. Karal Ann Marling  writes that "This usually took the form of an elaborate landscape with animals, which may or may not have alluded to the creatures in the stable at Bethlehem or the passengers on Noah’s Ark...the typical putz went beyond the limits of any biblical scene into pure, exuberant genre." These grew to encompass much more than a nativity scene, with animations such as working flour mills, jumping dogs, running water with waterfalls and electric trains, and could fill an entire room. Families would organize "putz parties" and compete for the best show. The term was derived from the German verb putzen, which means "to clean" or "to decorate."

Mass production

After World War II, several Japanese companies started mass-producing cardboard or paper houses, churches, and other buildings. These small buildings usually had holes in the back or the bottom through which Christmas lights were placed to provide illumination. The buildings had tiny colored cellophane windows and were decorated with mica-dusted roofs to give the appearance of snow. Since these buildings were made of inexpensive material and were widely available throughout the United States, they became a very popular Christmas decoration.

Modern villages

In the 1970s, ceramic or porcelain Christmas villages were introduced and started to gain popularity. Department 56 was one of the first companies to make these buildings and remains amongst the most well-known. Other companies, such as Lemax, have also produced similar villages, and there are numerous other brands sold. In Europe, Luville and Dickensville are established brands. 

Christmas village buildings are not usually made to consistent relative scale. A church building might well be ten times the height of an ordinary house in reality but this would make very cumbersome models and look odd within a Christmas village display. It is only necessary for the church building to be noticeably taller than the house, to give it an imposing stature.

Like many other Christmas traditions, the notion of a village to celebrate a holiday has spread to other holidays, with a few companies making Halloween and Easter villages.

See also 

 gingerbread house

References

External links
Bluffton man's intricate Christmas village fuses traditional Dickens-era style with Harbour Town Retrieved 25 August 2015
Connecticut Guide: A Christmas Village feature of The New York Times Retrieved 26 April 2013
Tiny Christmas Village shapes model future Retrieved 26 April 2013
Added Attractions in Christmas Village Retrieved 26 April 2013
10+ Christmas Village Sets That are Downright Adorable Retrieved 22 December 2022

See also

Christmas decorations
Nativity of Jesus in art
Village